Balakan may refer to:

 Balakən, Azerbaijan
 Balakan District, Azerbaijan
 Balakan, Qazvin, Iran
 Balakan, West Azerbaijan, Iran